Mad Liberation is an album by the electronic musician Grant Kwiecinski, released under the pseudonym GRiZ on 5 September 2012 under the All Good Records. It is his second album after the release of End of the World Party (2011). The album is a collection of songs recorded during 2011/2012. The songs range from original compositions to varied sample works.

Track listing

References

GRiZ albums
2012 albums